Опиум (Opium in English) is the third released single by Russian girl group Serebro. Given its order of release, the song is nicknamed "Song #3" after its predecessors "Song #1" and "Song #2" (Дыши). This was the fourth song to be made public from Serebro's album OpiumRoz after "What's Your Problem?" was performed at the RMA on 4 October 2007.

Debut
On 13 March 2008 Serebro announced on their official website that they would be releasing their third (official) single "Опиум". The song premiered on the Russian morning radio show 'BrigadaU' on Europa Plus radio. The video debuted on MUV-TV on 7 May 2008.

Charts
The song peaked at number one in Russia, becoming Serebro's second number one single.

Weekly charts

Year-end charts

References

External links
Serebro website
Behind the scenes
Russian/Moscow Airplay Chart archives

Serebro songs
2008 singles
Songs written by Maxim Fadeev
2008 songs
Number-one singles in the Commonwealth of Independent States